Wilhelm Ralph Merton (14 May 1848, in Frankfurt – 15 December 1916, in Berlin) was a prominent and influential German entrepreneur, social democrat, and philanthropist.  Among his most notable accomplishments, he was a founder of the University of Frankfurt and Metallgesellschaft AG, which became the largest non-ferrous mining company in the world and the second largest company in Germany.

Early life and education

On 5 November 1855, Ralph Moses and his family gained citizenship of the free city of Frankfurt. On 27 November, he was granted permission to call himself ‘Merton’ after claiming in his application for such (on 22 October 1856) that his brother Benjamin had already taken the family name ‘Merton’ in Manchester as the name ‘Moses’ was not suitable to be used as a surname.

Wilhelm Merton studied at Frankfurt’s grammar school, thereafter in Munich and he performed voluntary work at the Deutsche Bank in Berlin.

He married Emma Ladenburg in 1877 (born 1859 in Frankfurt, died in 1939), who was a daughter of Eugenie Halphen (1829–1866) and the businessman Emil Ladenburg (1822–1902), co-owner of the famous Ladenburg banking house. The couple had five children: Adolf, Alfred, Walter Henry, Gerda, and Richard.

Merton and his children converted to Protestantism in 1899. The Mertons—who had been English citizens hitherto—naturalised as Germans in the same year, and thereafter he bore the name Wilhelm Merton.

Metallgesellschaft AG
Merton's father had married the daughter of Philip Abraham Cohen who operated a metal firm which he became executive of upon his father-in-law's death. In 1881, Wilhelm Ralph Merton succeeded his father and soon took full control of the firm by bringing in outside investors, Leo Ellinger and cousin Zachary Hochschild, to get full ownership and incorporated it as a joint stock company named Metallgesellschaft AG. The Metallgesellschaft, with 40 employees and one telephone—the first telephones were installed in Frankfurt in 1881—at the outset traded in copper, lead, and zinc, later diversifying into nickel and aluminum.   Over the next hundred years, it grew into a company of over 20,000 employees with $10 billion revenue. It had over 250 subsidiaries specializing in mining, specialty chemicals (Chemetall), commodity trading, financial services, and engineering.

Initially in 1881, close business as well as personal ties had been formed with the firm of Henry R. Merton (HRM), the metals trading firm of the English branch of the family, named after another of Ralph's sons.

Since German mines could not satisfy the country's metal requirements, the company rapidly developed extensive relations abroad and within a short time Metallgesellschaft was represented in such cities as Basel, Amsterdam, Milan, Brussels, Stockholm, St. Petersburg, Moscow, Vienna, and Paris. Within a few years, therefore, a network of subsidiaries spanned the globe. In 1887, the American Metal Company was founded in New York City; in 1889, the Companhia de Minerales y Metales in Mexico and the Australian Metal Co. The last was the result of an expedition the company organized together with HRM and Degussa into the ore-rich Broken Hill district, where lead and lead concentrates were produced in vast quantities. This constituted the start of Metallgesellschaft's trading in ore, which would assume greater and greater importance in the future.

Although Wilhelm Merton is recorded in autobiographical notes as saying of Metallgesellschaft that: "Our trading company will not be involved in any kind of advertising" and is credited with the remark that it would be far more pleasant "to be able to pursue one's business without the need of the stock exchange, the public or the press," he broke fundamentally with his principles in one important way—the publication Metallstatistik, which had appeared annually since 1892, giving an overview of metal production, consumption, and prices worldwide, made Metallgesellschaft's name, to quote Wilhelm Merton again, "known, and I might add, respected." In general, however, Wilhelm Merton strongly objected to any interest in the firm which he considered to be excessive.

The First World War hit Metallgesellschaft hard. The good relations established abroad were broken off, imports of raw material dried up, the sister company HRM fell under the British Non-Ferrous Metals Industry Bill of November 1917, designed to eliminate enemy influence and control over the British ore and metal trade, and the deliveries of Australian ore failed to appear. This meant Metallgesellschaft had to obtain its metal supplies from neutral countries for as long as possible and eventually to use up domestic sources or intensify their exploitation. Three aluminum works were built, in conjunction with the firm Griesheim Elektron: in Horrem, close to Cologne; in Berlin-Rummelsburg; and in Bitterfeld near Halle.

Wilhelm Merton died suddenly of a heart attack on 15 December 1916 in Berlin after having already heart troubles for a long time prior.  He was buried in the main graveyard in Frankfurt.  His sons took over the control of Metallgesellschaft: , the eldest son, was the chairman of the supervisory board, while :de:Richard Merton, the second-born son, later became chief executive.

Achievements
On account of his socio-political endeavours primarily, Wilhelm Merton is regarded as one of the most prominent German entrepreneurs in the Wilhelmenian period.  He proved himself to no lesser degree in the financial world, in the period up until the beginning of the First World War, as the founder of initiatives aimed at humanising the economic world through scientific means.

He founded the ‘Institute for Community Wellbeing’ in 1890, and in 1901 the ‘Academy for Social and Trade Sciences’, both in Frankfurt. He was the driving force, with Franz Adickes (then Mayor of Frankfurt), in founding the University of Frankfurt.

Johann Wolfgang Goethe-University, as it was later called, became one of the most advanced universities of its time as a result of it adopting Merton’s idea of having a scientifically orientated university which was geared to the demands of modern economic society in terms both of education and of research.

Additionally, a vocational business school and a street in Bockenheim are named after him.

See also
Zachary Merton (brother)

References

Literature

 Hans Achinger: Wilhelm Merton in seiner Zeit. Frankfurt am Main 1965
 Wolfgang Klötzer (Hrg.), Frankfurter Biographie. Zweiter Band M-Z. Verlag Waldemar Kramer, Frankfurt am Main 1996,

External links

 
 Wilhelm Merton-Zentrum der Universität Frankfurt
 

1848 births
1916 deaths
19th-century German Jews
Goethe University Frankfurt
Businesspeople from Frankfurt
Burials at Frankfurt Main Cemetery
German businesspeople in metals
German commodities traders
German company founders
19th-century German businesspeople
20th-century German businesspeople
Naturalized citizens of Germany